Adaora Onyechere  is a Nigerian broadcast journalist, entrepreneur, motivational speaker, poet and author. She is a former co-anchor of Kakaaki, a daily talk show on Africa Independent Television. She currently hosts her own show, Talk to Adaora commonly known as Talk2Adaora on Kiss 99.9 FM Abuja. She is the founder of WEWE Network Afrique, a Pan-African organization. Talk2Adaora is a project of WEWE Network Afrique. She is also the CEO of Signature Heels Media.

Early life and education
Born in Nigeria to parents who are natives of Okigwe, a local government area of Imo State, Adaora Onyechere is the first child of six children. Her parents wanted her to be a lawyer but she studied English language and broadcasting. Onyechere speaks Igbo, Swahili, French and basic Spanish.

She had her primary school education at Starland Private School, Lagos where she completed her First School Leaving Certificate, then she had her Secondary school education at Owerri Girls Secondary School. She completed her A Level education at IRWIN College, England then subsequently obtained a diploma in Law at Coventry University before she graduated from London Metropolitan University after studying English Broadcasting. Onyechere also holds a master's degree in creative writing after graduating from Oxford Brooks University. She is also certified in BSL level 2 (Sign Language) and PMP Certification in Project Management. She is also a seasoned abstract Art painter.

Career
Prior to moving back into Nigeria in 2009, Onyechere wrote for Worldview Magazine London, a student-based magazine back in the U.K. She started broadcasting as a student in Coventry at Coventry Student Radio, then went ahead to work for Channel 4 in London. She also worked at BEN Television London as the Editor and Anchor for 'African Film Review'.

She had her first broadcasting stint in NIgeria as a radio presenter with Confluence Cable Network Limited, a broadcast media house in Kogi State before working for Federal Radio Corporation of Nigeria, Vision FM and DAAR Communications, a media company that houses Africa Independent Television, where she worked as a presenter till August 2018 after which she was nominated by a party called Action Alliance where she contested an election to represent her constituency in the Imo State House of Assembly. She lost to the APGA candidate. She was appointed the Special Assistant to the Governor on Information and Advocacy by the Governor Chukwuemeka Ihedioha.

Onyechere currently hosts her talk show on Kiss 99.9 FM, called "Talk2Adaora", the show looks at social issues in society and the gap between policymakers and citizens.

Publications
Apart from broadcasting, Onyechere is a motivational book author. Some of her published books include:
 Poetry for Life
 Black Girl With A White Heart
 Women In The World

She is also a motivational speaker and poet. Some of her published Spoken Words Include:
 Arise
 Fear
 the spoken word album Change Smitten, an 8 track spoken word compilation.''

Personal life
Onyechere is the initiator of several non-governmental organizations including the "Yellowjerrycan Save-A-Child Lend-A-Hand" project, a foundation that focuses on the welfare of children and women who have been victims of insurgencies and "International Rise Up Against Rape", an initiative against child abuse and rape. In 2018, she and her foundation led a campaign against child mortality. She also started a 5-man band called Oasis while at London Metropolitan University and was the lead singer and violinist.

See also

 List of Igbo people
 List of Nigerian media personalities

References

Living people
Nigerian television presenters
Nigerian women television presenters
Igbo television personalities
Nigerian radio presenters
Nigerian women radio presenters
Nigerian radio journalists
Alumni of Coventry University
Alumni of London Metropolitan University
Alumni of Oxford Brookes University
People from Anambra State
Nigerian women journalists
21st-century Nigerian women writers
Year of birth missing (living people)